Helmut Braunlich (born 19 May 1929 in Brünn, Moravia; d. 24 May 2013) was a German-American violinist, composer, and musicologist.

Education
He received his formal musical education at the Mozarteum in Salzburg, where he studied violin with Christa Richter-Steiner, composition with Egon Kornauth, and music history with Eberhard Preußner. After his immigration (1951) to the United States in 1951 he played with various professional symphony orchestras and became a member of the U.S. Air Force Symphony Orchestra. He studied composition at the Catholic University of America in Washington, D.C., where one of his teachers was the great organist, Prof. Conrad Bernier. After earning his master's degree in composition with a concerto for two violins and orchestra, he pursued doctoral studies, earning his Ph.D. in Musicology.

Career
Here he taught numerous courses in composition, music theory, and performance practice. In 1988 he was promoted to Professor.  In 1989 the state government of Bavaria, awarded him the "Sudetendeutscher Kulturpreis" in composition. He served as the chairperson of the Composition Department at the Benjamin T. Rome School of Music at the Catholic University of America, until he became Professor Emeritus in 1999. From then on he devoted his time mostly to composition and performance, but also taught selected graduate students.

Compositions
During his career he received commissions from a variety of organizations. Among them are the Contemporary Music Forum, the Montgomery County Youth Symphony Orchestra, the Catholic University Wind Ensemble, and the Friday Morning Music Club Foundation. As a member of the Society of Composers, Prof. Braunlich devotes his efforts to the promotion of composition, performance, understanding and dissemination of new and contemporary music. Compositions by Helmut Braunlich include works for orchestra, chamber music, works for various solo instruments, and songs. Several chamber music works have been published by McGinnis & Marx and by Tap Music Sales. His recordings are available on Educo Records, Opus One Records, and Centaur Compact Disc.

References

Braunlich, Helmut. "Satire in Music, 1900–1920." Ph.D. dissertation, Musicology, Catholic University of America, 1966. 160 p.
Braunlich, Helmut. "Johann Peter Kellner's Copy of the Sonatas and Partitas for Violin Solo by J. S. Bach." Bach xii/2 (Apr 1981), 2–10.
Bonnie Hedges and Bonlyn Hall, compilers. Twentieth-Century Composers in the Chesapeake Region: A Bio-Bibliography and Guide to Library Holdings. Richmond, Virginia: Chesapeake Chapter Music Library Association, 1994, 168 p.
, Bernadette, ed. Composer's Forum. The Directory [1989]. New York: Composers' Forum, 1989, p. 47.

External links
http://www.cua.edu
http://pipl.com/directory/people/HelmutBraunlich

1929 births
German male classical composers
German classical composers
American male classical composers
American classical composers
20th-century classical composers
Mozarteum University Salzburg alumni
German emigrants to the United States
Benjamin T. Rome School of Music, Drama, and Art alumni
Benjamin T. Rome School of Music, Drama, and Art faculty
2013 deaths
20th-century German composers
20th-century American composers
20th-century American male musicians
Catholic University of America alumni